KXOR-LP was a low-power television station in Eugene, Oregon, broadcasting locally in analog on UHF channel 36 as an affiliate of Azteca América.  Founded June 19, 1995, the station was owned by Churchill Media.

History
The station began with an original construction permit issued by the FCC to Adolfo Gomez on June 19, 1995. Originally to broadcast on UHF channel 64, the station was given callsign K64EZ. On December 11, 1995, Gomez sold the permit to the Three Angels Broadcasting Network Inc., who completed construction of the station, licensed it and began broadcasting on September 15, 1997. The station was granted permission to change to UHF channel 63 on February 11, 1997, and changed its callsign to K63GC. In August 1999, the station was granted a displacement application to move to UHF channel 36. It licensed the change on September 16, 2002, with new callsign K36FJ.

On December 30, 2009, KXOR-LP went off the air citing "substantial decreases in its revenue flow" over the past three years.   In its application to the FCC for special temporary authority to remain silent, the station's license holder claimed that "losses have reached the point that the station no longer generates sufficient funds to pay operating expenses" and that the company is seeking to either sell the station or refinance and return to operation. The license for KXOR-LP would soon be cancelled, as its signal remained dark for over a year, and KAMK-LD now broadcasts via digital television on Virtual Channel 36 in Eugene.

References
 Aztecha America affiliates its 62nd in Eugene, OR, with Churchill. Azteca America. January 17, 2008
  Local Spanish radio, TV stations go off the air. The Register-Guard. December 30, 2009.

Defunct television stations in the United States
Television channels and stations established in 1997
Television channels and stations disestablished in 2009
Mass media in Eugene, Oregon
1997 establishments in Oregon
2009 disestablishments in Oregon
XOR-LP